Otahuhu United is a football club in Auckland, New Zealand. Otahuhu United was formed in 1975 as a breakaway side from the Courier Rangers club, formed by parents and junior players unhappy with the organisation of that club. Initially sited at Bert Henham Park, the side were granted the right to play as part of the Auckland Association on the condition that only junior clubs could be fielded for the first three years. The club fielded numerous junior teams, playing in strips modelled on those of English side Norwich City F.C.

In 1990 the club moved to Seaside Park Reserve, the former home of Courier Rangers.

External links
New Zealand 2004/05 Season Results
Auckland Football Federation Otahuhu United page
club website

Association football clubs in Auckland
1975 establishments in New Zealand